I Dreamt Under the Water is a 2008 French romantic drama film directed and written by Hormoz. It tells the story of a bisexual man starving for love, who becomes a male prostitute.

Cast
Hubert Benhamdine as Antonin 
Caroline Ducey as  Juliette 
Christine Boisson as Fabienne 
Hicham Nazzal as Baptiste 
Franck Victor as Alex 
Hélène Michel as Babsi 
Eva Ionesco

See also
List of LGBT-related films by year

External links
 
 
 
 Febiofest- prague international film festival 2009

2008 films
French LGBT-related films
Male bisexuality in film
2000s French films